Lentulus may refer to:

 Gnaeus Cornelius Lentulus Clodianus, Roman senator and commander against Spartacus
 Publius Cornelius Lentulus Sura, Roman senator and Catilinarian conspirator
 Publius Cornelius Lentulus Spinther, Roman senator
 Lucius Cornelius Lentulus Crus, Roman senator and opponent of Julius Caesar
 Gnaeus Cornelius Lentulus Gaetulicus (consul 26), Roman senator, executed by the emperor Caligula
 Publius Lentulus, apocryphal Roman official, supposedly the author of an epistle describing Jesus

See also

 
 Cornelii Lentuli